The 2003 Rugby Canada Super League season was the sixth season for the RCSL.

Standings
Western Division
{| class="wikitable" style="text-align: center;"
|-
! width="250"|Team
! width="20"|Pld
! width="20"|W
! width="20"|D
! width="20"|L
! width="20"|F
! width="20"|A
! width="25"|+/-
! width="20"|BP
! width="20"|Pts
|-
|align=left| Calgary Mavericks
|6||5||0||1||239||110||+129||5||25
|-
|align=left| Vancouver Island Crimson Tide
|6||4||0||2||228||95||+133||5||21
|-
|align=left| Saskatchewan Prairie Fire
|6||4||1||1||186||123||+63||2||20
|-
|align=left| Vancouver Wave
|6||3||0||3||181||127||+54||4||16
|-
|align=left| Fraser Valley Venom
|6||3||1||2||181||150||+31||2||16
|-
|align=left| Edmonton Gold
|6||1||0||5||91||252||-161||0||4
|-
|align=left| Manitoba Buffalo
|6||0||0||6||48||307||-259||0||0
|}

Eastern Division
{| class="wikitable" style="text-align: center;"
|-
! width="250"|Team
! width="20"|Pld
! width="20"|W
! width="20"|D
! width="20"|L
! width="20"|F
! width="20"|A
! width="25"|+/-
! width="20"|BP
! width="20"|Pts
|-
|align=left| Toronto Xtreme
|4||4||0||0||188||52||+136||3||19
|-
|align=left| Newfoundland Rock
|4||3||0||1||129||36||+93||4||16
|-
|align=left| Nova Scotia Keltics
|4||2||0||2||54||98||-44||0||8
|-
|align=left| Ottawa Harlequins
|4||1||0||3||45||116||-71||0||4
|-
|align=left| New Brunswick Black Spruce
|4||0||0||4||54||168||-114||1||1
|}

MacTier Cup

The MacTier Cup is awarded to the RCSL Champions. The Calgary Mavericks (Western Division champions) defeated the Toronto Xtreme (Eastern Division Champions) 40–24 in the Championship Final, played in Calgary, Alberta on 26 July 2003. With the win, the Calgary Mavericks became the first team outside of British Columbia to win the MacTier Cup.

Game summary

References

Rugby Canada Super League seasons
RCSL Season
2003 in Canadian rugby union